Lycopodium clavatum (common club moss, stag's-horn clubmoss, running clubmoss, or ground pine) is the most widespread species in the genus Lycopodium in the clubmoss family.

Description
The leaves are 3–5 mm long and 0.7–1 mm broad, tapered to a fine hair-like white point. The horizontal stems produce roots at frequent intervals along their length, allowing the stem to grow indefinitely along the ground. The stems superficially resemble small seedlings of coniferous trees, though it is not related to these.

Distribution
Lycopodium clavatum has a widespread distribution across several continents. There are distinct subspecies and varieties in different parts of its range:
Lycopodium clavatum subsp. clavatum 
Lycopodium clavatum subsp. clavatum var. clavatum (Europe, Asia, North America)
Lycopodium clavatum subsp. clavatum var. aristatum (Mexico, Caribbean, Central America, northern South America south to northern Argentina)
Lycopodium clavatum subsp. clavatum var. asiaticum (Japan, northeast China)
Lycopodium clavatum subsp. clavatum var. borbonicum (central and southern Africa)
Lycopodium clavatum subsp. clavatum var. kiboanum (mountains of tropical Africa)
Lycopodium clavatum subsp. contiguum (southern Central America, northern South America; syn. Lycopodium contiguum)

Although globally widespread, like many clubmosses, it is confined to undisturbed sites, disappearing from farmed areas and sites with regular burning. As a result, it is endangered in many areas. In the UK it is one of 101 species named as a high priority for conservation by the wild plant charity Plantlife.

Other common names 
Common names for this species include wolf's-foot clubmoss, common clubmoss, wolf-paw clubmoss, running ground-pine, running pine, running moss, princess pine, and others.

Use
The spores of this moss, "lycopodium powder", are explosive if present in high density air. They were used as flash powder in early photography and magic acts.

Active constituents
Bioactive secondary metabolites in clubmosses include  triterpenoids with acetylcholinesterase inhibitor activity isolated from this species.

References

External links 
 Lycopodium clavatum, running ground pine, Flora, fauna, earth, and sky...The natural history of the northwoods 
 Bioimagesphotos
Jepson Manual Treatment, University of California
Calphotos Photo gallery, University of California
photo of herbarium specimen at Missouri Botanical Garden, collected in Dominican Republic in 1967

Lycopodiaceae
Medicinal plants
Flora of Asia
Flora of Africa
Flora of North America
Flora of the Caribbean
Flora of South America
Plants described in 1753
Taxa named by Carl Linnaeus